Søren Lilholt (born 22 September 1965) is a Danish former racing cyclist. He rode in eight Grand Tours between 1987 and 1992 completing five of them. He also competed at the 1984 Summer Olympics. During the 1990 Tour de France he was involved in many breakaway attempts as he placed in the top ten for the overall Combativity award.

Major results

1983
 World Road Championships
1st  Junior road race
1st  Junior team time trial (with Kim Olsen, Alex Pedersen and Rolf Sørensen)
1984
 1st Stage 1 Tour of Sweden
1985
 2nd Overall Circuit Franco Belge
 2nd Grand Prix de la Ville de Lillers
1986
 1st Stage 2 Tour of Sweden
 1st Stage 2 Étoile de Bessèges
 2nd Tour de Vendée
 2nd Overall Tour de Luxembourg
 3rd Grand Prix de Plouay
1987
 1st  Overall Tour de Luxembourg
1st Stage 1
 2nd Omloop van het Waasland
 3rd Overall Danmark Rundt
1988
 1st  National Road Race Championships
 1st Stage 4 Tour of Sweden
 1st Stage 2 Paris–Nice
 1st Overall Tour d'Armorique
 1st Stages 3 & 4B Tour de Luxembourg
 3rd Overall Danmark Rundt
 3rd Overall Étoile de Bessèges
1989
 2nd Giro del Piemonte
1990
 1st E3 Harelbeke
 1st Stage 3 Volta a la Comunitat Valenciana
 1st Stage 4 Tour of Britain
 1st Stage 1 Tour d'Armorique
 1st Flèche Hesbignonne
 2nd Grand Prix de Fourmies
 2nd National Time Trial Championships
 3rd Grand Prix Pino Cerami
1991
 1st Stage 4 Volta a la Comunitat Valenciana
 3rd A Travers le Morbihan

Grand Tour general classification results timeline

References

External links
 

1965 births
Living people
Danish male cyclists
Olympic cyclists of Denmark
Cyclists at the 1984 Summer Olympics
Cyclists from Copenhagen